Ibrahim Ogohi   , (14 November 1948) is a retired Nigerian Navy admiral, who was the first naval officer to become Chief of Defence Staff of Nigeria from 1999 to 2003 and the first Naval Officer to reach four star rank in the Nigerian military during the civilian administration of Nigeria.

Background 
He had his early education in St John's College Kaduna from 1962 to 1966. He enrolled in Nigeria Defence Academy in 1967 of regular course 4 passing out in 1970 and then Midshipman course in United Kingdom in 1971 and technical course India in 1972, under water Warfare Course India in 1976 then the United States Naval War College Course in 1980 and in 1992.

He was Commanding officer Eken NNS France in 1982, commander NNS Anansa in 1985 and director Administrator in Nigeria Defence Academy in 1986 to 1987. In 1992 he was commanding directing staff in National War College and deputy commandant Armed forces command staff College, Jaji in 1995. In May 1999 he was Chief of Defence Staff till 2003.

Notes 

1948 births
Living people
Nigerian Navy admirals
Nigerian Defence Academy alumni